Bernos-Beaulac (Occitan: Bernòs e Baulac) is a commune in the Gironde department in Nouvelle-Aquitaine in southwestern France.

The principal settlement in the commune is the village of Beaulac, situated where the  crosses the Ciron river.

The RN 524 forms part of the Itinéraire à Grand Gabarit, a route which has been modified to allow its use by the oversize road convoys conveying body sections and wings of the Airbus A380 airliner.

Population

Personalities
 Mitt Romney was injured in a car accident June 16, 1968 in Bernos-Beaulac, when he was a Mormon missionary in France. He had a broken arm, but was mistakenly declared dead at the scene of the accident.

See also
Communes of the Gironde department

References

External links

 Official website (in French)

Communes of Gironde